Manuel Scalise (born 28 August 1981) is an Italian football coach and former professional footballer who played as a defender or midfielder. He was most recently the head coach of Piacenza.

Playing career 
He played in the minor leagues with Saronno, Brescello, Legnago Salus, Montevarchi, Sangiovannese, Grosseto, Pavia, Lucchese, Alessandria and Olbia.

In July 2010 he went to Nocerina, who at the end of the season was promoted to Serie B.

The following year he played 18 games with the Campanians and in January 2012 moved to Ascoli, where he collected 18 more appearances in the second league, scoring a goal.

On 23 January 2014 signed a contract with Salernitana, and 28 August 2014, is sold outright to Mantova. In October 2016 he signed for Cosenza.

Coaching career
After retiring following a season at Cosenza, Scalise stayed under contract with the Calabrian side as a youth coach. In December 2019, he took on his first head coaching role at Eccellenza amateurs Borgo San Donnino. In 2020 he moved to Club Milano, another Eccellenza club.

In 2021, Scalise left Club Milano for Serie D club Caronnese, leading them to seventh place in the 2021–22 Serie D season.

On 1 June 2022, Serie C club Piacenza announced to have hired Scalise as their new head coach on a two-year deal, effective from the start of the 2022–23 season. On 2 October 2022, he was sacked after a dismal start in the club's campaign, leaving Piacenza at the bottom of the league table.

References

Italian footballers
Montevarchi Calcio Aquila 1902 players
A.S.D. Sangiovannese 1927 players
F.C. Grosseto S.S.D. players
F.C. Pavia players
S.S.D. Lucchese 1905 players
U.S. Alessandria Calcio 1912 players
Olbia Calcio 1905 players
A.S.G. Nocerina players
Ascoli Calcio 1898 F.C. players
Serie B players
Association football midfielders
People from Rho, Lombardy
1981 births
Living people
Footballers from Lombardy
Sportspeople from the Metropolitan City of Milan
Italian football managers
Piacenza Calcio 1919 managers